The Tonga women's national football team represents Tonga in international women's football. The team is controlled by the Tonga Football Association. Their best title was Third in the 2007 OFC Women's Championship.

Results and fixtures

The following is a list of match results in the last 12 months, as well as any future matches that have been scheduled.

Legend

2022

Current squad
The following players were called up for the 2022 OFC Women's Nations Cup from 13 to 30 July in Suva, Fiji.

Caps and goals updated as of 12 July 2022, before the game against Samoa.

2019 squad
The following players were called up for the 2019 Pacific Games from 8–20 July in Apia, Samoa.

Caps and goals updated as of 18 July 2019, after the game against Fiji.

Recent call-ups
The following players have been called up for the team in the last 12 months.

Competitive record

FIFA Women's World Cup

OFC Women's Nations Cup

*Draws include knockout matches decided on penalty kicks.

Pacific Games

Pacific Mini Games

See also

Sport in Tonga
Football in Tonga
Women's football in Tonga
Tonga men's national football team

References

External links
Official website
FIFA profile

Oceanian women's national association football teams
women